The Los Angeles Open was a former tennis tournament held in Los Angeles, United States from 1927 until 2012. It included a women's draw until 1974 when Linda Lewis won the last ladies title. Subsequently, it became a men-only event and integrated into the ATP's professional tennis circuit. The inaugural edition of the event, known as the Pacific Southwest Championships, was organized by Perry T. Jones and held at the Los Angeles Tennis Club (LATC) starting in October 1927. Bill Tilden and Kea Bouman were the first singles champions. The tournament quickly became a prestigious event on the tennis calendar.

History
The tournament was usually held in September and hosted the top men (and until 1975, women) in the world. Tournament winners from its beginning in 1927 until 1967 included most of the world's No. 1 tennis players: Bill Tilden, Ellsworth Vines, Don Budge, Fred Perry, Jack Kramer, Pancho Gonzales and amateur champions Roy Emerson and Barry MacKay. In the open era the event was known by various (sponsored) names including Farmers Classic, Countrywide Classic, Los Angeles Tennis Open, Pacific South West Open and Jack Kramer Open. Jack Kramer became the tournament director in 1970 when Jones retired. In the open era, the tournament was won by Rod Laver twice, a second and third time by Gonzales, Stan Smith, Arthur Ashe, Jimmy Connors, John McEnroe, Pete Sampras, Richard Krajicek, and  Andre Agassi. In doubles, Bob and Mike Bryan won a record six titles.

From 1975 to 1979 the tournament was played indoors at the Pauley Pavilion. Beginning in 1984, the tournament was held at the Los Angeles Tennis Center at UCLA, which was built to host the 1984 Summer Olympics tennis event.  The matches were played on the Straus Stadium court with a capacity of 6,500 and the 1,500-seat capacity Grandstand court. In its last years it was an ATP World Tour 250 series tournament on the ATP Tour and had a 28-player singles draw and 16-team doubles draw. The tournament, with prize money of $557,550 in 2012, was one of the events included in the US Open Series. Special events during the tournament's run included Kids Day, Fashion Day, Valspar Performance Challenge, and a Legends Invitational Singles competition.

Colombian investors purchased the tournament's license for $1.5 million at the end of 2012 and moved the tournament to Bogotá. The new tournament is called the Claro Open Colombia.

Past winners

Men's singles

Women's singles

Men's doubles

Most titles

Previous names

See also
 Pacific Coast Championships – tournament held in various locations in Northern California (1889–2013)
 LA Women's Tennis Championships – women's tournament (1971–2009)

References

External links
Official website

 
Tennis tournaments in California
Hard court tennis tournaments in the United States
US Open Series
Defunct tennis tournaments in the United States
1927 establishments in California
2012 disestablishments in California
Recurring sporting events established in 1927
Recurring sporting events disestablished in 2012